The 2006 Kerrick Sports Sedan Series was an Australian motor racing competition which was recognised by Confederation of Australian Motor Sport (CAMS) as a National Series.
It was the third National Series for Sports Sedans to be contested in Australia following the discontinuation of the Australian Sports Sedan Championship at the end of 2003 and was the first to carry the "Kerrick Sports Sedan Series" name.

The following cars were eligible to compete in the series:
 Class SS: Cars complying with CAMS regulations for Group 3D Sports Sedans
 Class TS: Trans Am Cars complying with Australian regulations for North American Trans-Am competition
 Class TNZ: TraNZam cars complying with TRG of New Zealand regulations 
 Class TA: Australian Transzam cars complying with class TA regulations

The series was won by Dean Randle driving a Saab 9-3 Aero.

Calendar
The series was contested over five rounds.

Points system
Series points were awarded in each race as per the following table:

In addition, 2 points were awarded for first place in the qualifying classification.

Series standings

References

External links
 Gallery, www.sportssedans.com.au, as archived at web.archive.org

National Sports Sedan Series
Sports Sedans